Zane is a given name and surname.

Zane may also refer to:
 Zanè, a town in the province of Vicenza, Veneto, Italy
 Zane, a town in Batroun, Lebanon
 Zane (author), pseudonym of author Kristina Laferne Roberts
 Zane family, a pioneer family in the United States
 Zane State College, Ohio
 Zane Township, Logan County, Ohio
 Zane's Trace, a frontier road in Ohio
 21991 Zane, a main belt asteroid
 USS Zane (DD-337), American warship, named after Randolph Zane

See also
 Zanesville, Ohio
 Zanesfield, Ohio
 
 Zain (disambiguation)
 Zayin